Alana Bartol (born June 15, 1981 in Halifax, Nova Scotia) is a Canadian artist currently based in Calgary and teaching at the Alberta University of the Arts. Alana's multidisciplinary practice involves aspects of performance, installation, video and bioart through site-responsive and community embedded practices. Her work explores topics of place, species, bodies, and care, and draws upon the divination practice of dowsing.

Bartol has been exhibited at Plug In Institute of Contemporary Art (Winnipeg), ARC Gallery (Chicago), Contemporary Art Institute of Detroit, Karsh-Masson Gallery (Ottawa), SIMULTAN Festival (Romania), Museo de la Ciudad (Guadalajara, Mexico), Access Gallery (Vancouver), InterAccess (Toronto), Media City Film Festival (Windsor, ON), Groupe Intervention Vidéo (Montréal) and TRUCK Gallery (Calgary) among others.

Alana is the recipient of grants from the Canada Council for the Arts, The City of Windsor and the Ontario Arts Council.

Exhibitions 

In September 2017 Bartol initiated the Orphan Well Adoption Agency, a project facilitating the symbolic adoption of abandoned oil and gas wells.
The project was hosted by Truck Contemporary Art Gallery in 2017 in the form of a pop-up office space where gallery visitors could ask questions and file a symbolic adoption.

References

External links 

 
 Orphan Well Adoption Agency
 Water Witching for Wanderers (and Wonderers)
 What Happened When One Artist Tried to Walk Calgary’s 174-km City Limits, Canadian Art

1981 births
Artists from Nova Scotia
Canadian women artists
Living people
People from Halifax, Nova Scotia